John Postley (May 30, 1940 – July 31, 1970) was an American professional basketball player who spent one season in the American Basketball Association (ABA) as a member of the Pittsburgh Pipers (1967–68). He also played for the Williamsport Billies and the Wilkes-Barre Barons of the Eastern Basketball Association. He signed with the Philadelphia 76ers prior to the 1968-1969 season but was cut before the start of the season. He did not play high school or college basketball.

Postley was discovered by John Chaney, who helped him into the Barons, where in the 1969–70 season he was the league's leading rebounder. Postley collapsed and died from a heart attack in a pro-am league game on July 31, 1970 in Philadelphia at age 30.

See also
List of basketball players who died during their careers

References

External links
 

1940 births
1970 deaths
American men's basketball players
Basketball players from Philadelphia
Bethune–Cookman University alumni
Centers (basketball)
Forwards (basketball)
Pittsburgh Pipers players
Wilkes-Barre Barons players
Williamsport Billies (basketball) players
Sports competitors who died in competition
Sports deaths in Pennsylvania